Thomas Sullivan (born April 18, 1950) is an American former professional basketball player and college coach.

Playing career
Sullivan grew up in the Bronx, New York City. He played collegiately at Fordham University and was a four-year letterwinner from 1968 to 1969 through 1971–72, playing the center position. As a senior, Sullivan was the Rams' co-captain and named the team MVP. He guided Fordham to a berth in the National Invitation Tournament where they would lose in the first round to Jacksonville. At the end of that season, Sullivan was presented with the Haggerty Award, given annually since 1935–36 to the top male collegiate basketball player in the greater New York City area. He was the co-recipient with Manhattan's Richie Garner, becoming the first duo to share the award in its history up to that point.

Following his career at Fordham, Sullivan was chosen in the 1972 NBA Draft by the New York Knicks. He was taken in the ninth round (139th overall). Although he was drafted, Sullivan never played in the National Basketball Association. Instead, he went to Italy to play professionally in 1972–73, took the following year off to coach back in the United States, and then spent the 1974–75 playing again, only this time in Switzerland. After two seasons in three years playing as an expatriate professional basketball player, Sullivan returned to the United States to pursue coaching full-time.

Coaching career
Sullivan began his coaching career as an assistant at Hunter College during the interim year between professional seasons. His next job came as an assistant coach at New Hampshire College (now Southern New Hampshire University) during 1975–76, and after only one year at the school he became its full-time head coach in 1976. Sullivan stayed at New Hampshire College from 1976 to 1977 through 1984–85 and also concurrently served as the athletic director for much of his tenure. During his nine-year career at the NCAA Division II school, he compiled an overall record of 152–99, including three 20-win seasons. Sullivan led the team to two Division II New England Region championships (1980, 1981) as he earned regional coach of the year honors both of those years.

He left New Hampshire College to take the reins at Manhattan College in which he compiled a 2–26 overall record his first year there. Sullivan only stayed one season, however, and left to become P. J. Carlesimo's assistant at Seton Hall between 1987–88 and 1993–94. During this seven-year stretch, the Pirates made six NCAA Division I Tournaments, including a national championship game appearance in 1989, which they lost to Michigan in overtime.

When Carlesimo left after 1993–94, Sullivan was a finalist for the head coaching vacancy. The position ultimately went to George Blaney from Holy Cross. After a one-year absence from coaching, Sullivan became the new head coach at UMBC in 1995. Over the course of his nine-year coaching career at UMBC, he compiled an overall record of 106–145, becoming the second coach in program history to amass 100 wins. He named the Big South Conference Coach of the Year in 1998 after an eight-game improvement from the season before, and in 1999 was named the Northeast Conference Coach of the Year. The school had switched conferences between years, and the 1998–99 season saw the Retrievers set a league record for consecutive wins to begin a season (15) en route to the conference regular season title. Three years later, and for the first time in the program's Division I history, UMBC won 20 games in a season under Sullivan's guidance. After that season he signed a contract extension to be effective through the 2006–07 season. However, after a 7–21 year in 2003–04, Sullivan resigned. His career college head coaching record is 260–270 in 19 seasons.

Head coaching record

References

1950 births
Living people
American expatriate basketball people in Italy
American expatriate basketball people in Switzerland
American men's basketball players
Basketball coaches from New York (state)
Basketball players from New York City
Centers (basketball)
College men's basketball head coaches in the United States
Fordham Rams men's basketball players
Hunter Hawks men's basketball coaches
Manhattan Jaspers basketball coaches
New York Knicks draft picks
Seton Hall Pirates men's basketball coaches
Southern New Hampshire Penmen athletic directors
Southern New Hampshire Penmen men's basketball coaches
Basketball players from Baltimore
Sportspeople from the Bronx
UMBC Retrievers men's basketball coaches